The Project 89 minesweeper, also known as the Kondor class, was a class of minesweepers designed in the German Democratic Republic which was given the NATO designation of "Kondor". There were three versions, namely, the prototype unit, Project 89.0; the first version, Project 89.1 (NATO designation: Kondor I); and the second version, Project 89.2 (NATO designation: Kondor II).

Ships in class

Foreign service

Cape Verde
The Kondor I vessel Kuhlungsborn was used by the German Coast Guard. In 1998 it was transferred to Cape Verde and was renamed Vigilante carrying the pennant number P 521. It is still in service.

Estonia
The Kondor I vessels Komet and Meteor were transferred to Estonia as Vambola and Sulev in 1994. Sulev was scrapped in 2000 while Vambola remains laid up awaiting to be scrapped.

Indonesia
Nine Kondor II vessels were transferred to Indonesia around 1994. They are still in active service.

Latvia
Two Kondor II vessels were transferred to Latvia in 1992 and were renamed Viesturs and Imanta. They were used as minehunters until they decommissioned in 2008.

Malta

A third ship, Boltenhagen, was also sold in 1997 and it was given the pennant number . The three vessels served with the Offshore Command of the Maritime Squadron of the AFM until they were decommissioned in 2004 and were replaced by more modern patrol boats. P29 was scuttled as an artificial diving site off Ċirkewwa in 2007, while P31 followed being sunk off Comino in 2009. As of 2013, P30 was laid up at Cassar Ship Repair Yard, Marsa.

Tunisia
Five Kondor I minesweepers were transferred to the Tunisian Navy as coastal patrol craft according to Jane's Fighting Ships for 1999-2000. Today only one is still in service.

Uruguay
The Kondor II vessels Riesa, Eilenburg, Bernau and Eisleben were transferred to Uruguay and renamed Temerario, Valiente, Fortuna and Audaz on 11 October 1991. Valiente was rammed by the Panamian freighter Skyros on 5 August 2000 and was torn in half with 8 sailors killed and 3 missing. Fortuna was scrapped and the  other two are still in service.

References

Further reading 
 
  ((East German Navy:  German naval forces during the Cold War)), Volksmarine der DDR: Deutsche Seestreitkräfte im Kalten Krieg.  1999.  by Friedrich Elchlepp, Walter Jablonsky, Fritz Minow, Manfred Röseberg.  360 pages.  Verlag E.S. Mittler & Sohn, Hamburg-Berlin-Bonn.   paperback,  other.  On page 231, "Verbleib der Schiffe und Boote nach Auflösung der VM"  ((fate of ships after dissolution of the volksmarine)) ... Uruguay is listed as acquiring three Kondor-II class minesweepers. 
  ((Ships and Boats of the East German Navy)), Schiffe und Boote der Volksmarine der DDR, by Manfred Röseberg, Ingo Koch Verlag Rostock, 2002 
  ((The other German Navy)), Die andere deutsche Marine, by H.Mehl / K.Schäfer, Motorbuch Verlag, Stuttgart,  
  ((Military Tech series:  Minesweepers and Ramming-ships)), Heft Minensuch- und Räumschiffe, Reihe Militärtechnische Hefte, by Bernd Oesterle, 1983, Militärverlag der DDR, Berlin

External links 

 Projekt 89.1 MSR - Kurz Kondor 1 
 Minensuch- und Räumschiff Projekt 89.1 parow-info.de 
 "Kondors" at Shipbucket.com

Ships of the Volksmarine
Naval ships of Cape Verde
Naval ships of East Germany
Naval ships of Estonia
Naval ships of Germany
Naval ships of Indonesia
Naval ships of Latvia
Kondor class
Naval ships of Tunisia
Naval ships of Uruguay
Mine warfare vessel classes
Ships built in Wolgast
Cold War minesweepers of Germany